Achilles was built at Sunderland in 1799. Although early on she made some voyages to the West Indies, she spent most of her mercantile career trading with the Baltic and northern Russia, and as a coaster. However, between about 1810 and 1814, she served as a transport under Transport Board. She suffered three maritime mishaps before 1835 and assisted at a fourth. She was lengthened in 1835. Her crew abandoned her in October 1839 and she subsequently foundered.

Career
Achilles first appeared in the Register of Shipping (RS) in 1800, and in Lloyd's Register (LR) in 1801. In 1799 Achilles, Haddock, master, was already trading with Petersburg.

On 18 December 1808, Brighton Packet, of Deal, was in a sinking state. Achilles took off her crew and brought them into Torbay.  On 20 December, Achilles, Weatherby, master, came into Torbay. She had bee sailing from Portsmouth to  Newcastle when she had been driven off St Valery.

Achilles re-entered the Register of Shipping with the volume for 1816.

On 24 December 1818, Achilles, of South Shields, was sailing from Newcastle to London with a cargo of coal when Beaver, Lyle, master, ran into her. Beaver was sailing from London to Banff, her crew was not watching out, and Achilless crew was not able to get their attention. Beaver sank but Achilles rescued the crew.

On 2 October 1823 a storm caught Achilles, Kirkley, master, between the Spurn and the floating light. Achilles lost her foremast and bowsprit. Two smacks came out and towed her into Hull.

On 21 April 1829, Achilles, Scotland, master, struck a rock. She was towed into Loch Tarbert in a sinking state.

{| class=" wikitable"
|-
! Year
! Master
! Owner
! Trade
! Source & notes
|-
| 1832
| Kirkley
| Kirkley
| Yarmouth coaster
| RS; repair 1823, & large repair 1826
|-
| 1834
| Dickinson
|
|
| 'LR|-
| 1835
| DickinsonCrawford
| Kell & Son
| Newcastle–London
| LR; lengthened & thorough repair 1835
|-
|}

Fate
On 20 October 1839 Achilles, Patten, master, was on a voyage from South Shields to London with a cargo of coal. She anchored off Cromer, having lost her mainmast and foretopmast. Her crew abandoned her, coming ashore in the lifeboats. She foundered on 29 October.

Her entry in the 1839 volume of Lloyd's Register'' carried the annotation "Foundered".

Citations

1799 ships
Maritime incidents in 1808
Maritime incidents in 1818
Maritime incidents in October 1823
Maritime incidents in April 1829
Maritime incidents in October 1839